The 1988 Australian Touring Car season was the 29th year of touring car racing in Australia since the first runnings of the Australian Touring Car Championship and the fore-runner of the present day Bathurst 1000, the Armstrong 500.

There were 16 touring car race meetings held during 1988; a nine-round series, the 1988 Australian Touring Car Championship (ATCC); the four round Amaroo Park based AMSCAR series (Round 3 doubled as Round 8 of the ATCC); a support programme event at the 1988 Australian Grand Prix and three long-distance races, nicknamed 'enduros'.

Results and standings

Race calendar
The 1988 Australian touring car season consisted of 16 events.

Australian Touring Car Championship

James Hardie Building Products AMSCAR Series

Pepsi 250

Enzed Sandown 500

Tooheys 1000

South Australia Cup 
This race was a support event at the 1988 Australian Grand Prix meeting. This was Larry Perkins' first win in Australia since the 1984 Bathurst 1000 and also the only Holden win for the year. This would be the final time that the touring cars would only have a single race at the Australian Grand Prix. Starting in 1989, the tourers would have one race on the Saturday afternoon following the Formula One final qualifying session with a second race the following morning on F1 race day.

References

Linked articles contain additional references.

External links
 Official V8 Supercar site

Australian Touring Car Championship
Touring Cars